"If You Want Me To" is a song co-written and recorded by American country music singer Joe Diffie.  It was released in December 1990 as the second single from his debut album A Thousand Winding Roads. The song reached the Top 5 on the Billboard Hot Country Singles & Tracks (now Hot Country Songs) chart.  The song was written by Diffie and Larry Williams.

Music video
This was Diffie's first music video. It was directed by Marius Penczner and premiered in late 1990.

Chart performance
The song debuted at number 53 on the Hot Country Singles & Tracks chart dated December 15, 1990. It charted for 20 weeks on that chart, and peaked at number 2 on the country chart dated March 2, 1991.

Charts

Year-end charts

References

1990 singles
1990 songs
Joe Diffie songs
Songs written by Joe Diffie
Song recordings produced by Bob Montgomery (songwriter)
Epic Records singles